The 2005 Biante Models Cars Historic Touring Car Series was an Australian motor racing competition for Group N cars. It was recognised by the Confederation of Australian Motor Sport as a National Series.

The series was open to:
 Group Na - Touring Cars pre 1958
 Group Nb - Production Touring Cars pre 1965
 Group Nc - Production Touring Cars 1965-1977

The series was won by Brad Tilley driving a Ford XY Falcon.

Schedule

The series was contested over six rounds with each round contested over three races.

Points system
Outright series points were awarded at each race on the following basis:

Class points were awarded at each race on the following basis:

Series standings

The above table shows only the top ten series placings outright and the top three placings in each class.

References

External links
 2005 Bathurst, Biante Series 2005, Round Five, www.htcav.com.au, as archived at web.archive.org

Biante Model Cars Historic Touring Car Series
Touring Car Masters